Sung Si-Bak (Hangul: 성시백, Hanja: 成始柏, ; born February 18, 1987, in Seoul, South Korea) is a South Korean short track speed skater. At the 2007 Winter Universiade, he won all five short track speed skating events. Sung has won more than 20 World Cup races and earned two World Cup titles, in addition to skating on the winning World Championship 5000 m relay teams in 2007 and 2008. He qualified for the 2010 Winter Olympics in Vancouver, British Columbia, Canada. Sung was in medal contention leading into the final lap of the 1500 m event there, when a crash between him and a teammate led to his finishing in 5th place.

Career
Sung began speedskating in elementary school at the behest of his parents, who hoped that it would help make him stronger. He nearly gave up the sport in order to continue his schooling, but chose to continue training as a professional speedskater.

Sung's career in the short track speed skating world cup has been a successful one. In the 500 m, he took first place in the 2007/2008 season, second in the 2008/2009 season, and third in the 2009/2010 season. In the 1500 m, he was first in 2008/2009 and third in 2009/2010. In total, he has won more than 20 World Cup races. He has also seen some success in World Championships. In 2007 and 2008, he was a member of the world champion 5000 m relay teams. He and his South Korean teammates also won the World Team Championships in 2009, having earned third place the previous year and second in 2007.

Sung was selected for the South Korean team at the 2010 Winter Olympics to compete in four events, the 500 m, the 1000 m, the 1500 m, and the 5000 m team relay.

In the first of these events, the 1500 m, Sung was among the three leading skaters, all South Koreans, going into the final lap when he was taken out by his teammate Lee Ho-Suk who attempted to pass him and both collided and slid into the wall. The fall allowed Americans Apolo Anton Ohno and J. R. Celski to take silver and bronze. Lee Ho-Suk was disqualified for causing the fall, and Sung who would have gotten silver, finished in 5th place.

In the heat race for the 1000 m competition, he set an Olympic Record with a time of 1:24.245.  However, disappointingly he didn't advance to the finals as he finished third in the semi-finals.  During the pre-finals of 1000 m, he was disqualified from the event for bumping another skater.

In the 500m Olympic Final, Sung was in the lead but slipped in the final corner before making contact with Charles Hamelin, and ended up crossing the finish line third.  However, he was able to take the Silver medal due to a disqualification of Apolo Ohno.

See also 
 South Korea at the 2010 Winter Olympics

References

External links
 Sung Si-Bak's biography on nbcolympics.com

1987 births
Living people
South Korean male short track speed skaters
Olympic short track speed skaters of South Korea
Olympic silver medalists for South Korea
Olympic medalists in short track speed skating
Short track speed skaters at the 2010 Winter Olympics
Medalists at the 2010 Winter Olympics
Asian Games medalists in short track speed skating
Asian Games gold medalists for South Korea
Asian Games bronze medalists for South Korea
Short track speed skaters at the 2011 Asian Winter Games
Medalists at the 2011 Asian Winter Games
Universiade medalists in short track speed skating
Medalists at the 2007 Winter Universiade
Universiade gold medalists for South Korea
Competitors at the 2005 Winter Universiade
Competitors at the 2007 Winter Universiade
South Korean Buddhists
21st-century South Korean people